The Rain's Coming World Tour is first worldwide concert tour (second overall) by South Korean singer Rain. It saw 17 shows in Asia, North America and Australia from December 2006 to October 2007 in support of his fourth Korean studio album Rain's World (2006). A free promotional concert was held at the Seoul Olympic Stadium one day prior to the album's release.

History
The Rain's Coming World Tour began on December 15, 2006, at Seoul Olympic Stadium in Seoul and was scheduled to continue through 2007 to the following countries: Singapore, Malaysia, Thailand, Vietnam, China, Japan, Taiwan, Australia, United States, and Canada. His tour incorporated the talents of producers and stage designers (such as Jamie King and Roy Bennett) who have been involved with the concert tours of other artists such as U2, Michael Jackson, Ricky Martin, Madonna, Britney Spears, and The Rolling Stones. Ticket sales were expected to be over US$100 million.

His concert at the Tokyo Dome on May 25, 2007, attracted nearly 40,000 people. Rain was the first Korean artist to perform at the Tokyo Dome.

Legal issues
On his World 2007 tour, his scheduled concerts in Shanghai, Toronto, San Francisco, Atlanta, San Jose and Hawaii were canceled, followed by the last concert in Los Angeles. The last event at the Staples Center was canceled only two hours prior to opening: Rain's producer blamed the situation on financial problems of the local promoter, while the local promoter blamed Wellmade STAR M calling them too "incompetent to handle the situation."

On March 19, 2009, a federal jury in Honolulu found that Rain, his former management agency JYP Entertainment, and two other promotion companies were guilty of breaching a contract and defrauding Honolulu promoter Click Entertainment for $2 million (originally just over $1 million) after the Hawaii concert was canceled and the promoters were not refunded the $500,000 licensing fee. Rain and JYP were ordered to pay $2.4 million each in punitive damages, $1 million for damages related to the fraud, and $2.3 million for breach of contract.

A separate lawsuit filed by promoters Wellmade STAR M was dismissed by a South Korean court on January 28, 2010. Judge Bae Kwang-Kuk ruled in favor of Rain and blamed the plaintiff for poor preparations surrounding the cancelled U.S. tour.

Shows

Notes

References

External links
 Rain's official site

2006 concert tours
2007 concert tours
Rain (entertainer) concert tours